Kopcie may refer to the following places:
Kopcie, Gmina Domanice in Masovian Voivodeship (east-central Poland)
Kopcie, Subcarpathian Voivodeship (south-east Poland)
Kopcie, Świętokrzyskie Voivodeship (south-central Poland)
Kopcie, Gmina Suchożebry in Masovian Voivodeship (east-central Poland)
Kopcie, Węgrów County in Masovian Voivodeship (east-central Poland)